The North American Labour Party was a Canadian political party that  nominated candidates in federal elections in the 1970s. However, because it was not a registered political party under the rules of Elections Canada, its candidates were considered to be independents.

The NALP was the Canadian affiliate of the Lyndon LaRouche movement, and later became the Party for the Commonwealth of Canada/Party for the Commonwealth-Republic.

The North American Labour Party nominated candidates in two provincial elections in British Columbia. In the 11 December 1975 election, the party’s four candidates collected 141 votes, less than 0.01% of the popular vote. In the 26 April 1979 elections, its four candidates collected 297 votes, 0.02% of the popular vote.

The party also ran candidates in the 1975 and 1977 provincial elections in the province of Ontario.  The party was not registered in 1977, and its six candidates appeared on the ballot as independents.  NALP candidates also ran in Toronto and Montreal municipal elections of 1978.

The NALP did not have an official leader in Ontario during the 1977 election, although Joe Brewda appears to have been the party's spokesman.  In an interview with the Toronto Star, published on June 6, 1977, Brewda argued that his party was rooted in socialism but encompassed other viewpoints as well.  He is quoted as saying, "our program is based on economic growth and represents the vital interests of conservative industrialists, workers and some scientific layers".  He also argued in support of a gold-backed monetary system, and alleged that his party would have received 15% of the vote in the previous election had it not been for massive voter fraud.

An article from The Globe and Mail of January 2, 1980 lists Richard Sanders as the main Toronto organizer of the NALP, and accuses the party of anti-Semitism.  Sanders is cited in this article as alleging massive voter fraud against his party.

During the 1978 mayoral contest, Sanders was quoted as making the following statements: "The trouble with Toronto, is its porno press, the Sun, Star and Globe and Mail!  I'm the one to stop banks running drugs into Canada from the Cayman Islands.  Smith, O'Donohue and Sewell are puffballs!" (Globe and Mail, 1 November 1978)

See also
List of political parties in Canada

Labour parties in Canada
Defunct political parties in Canada
LaRouche movement